Isaurica is a genus of gastropods belonging to the family Helicidae.

The species of this genus are found in the Balkans.

Species:

Isaurica callirhoe 
Isaurica lycia 
Isaurica pamphylica 
Isaurica riedeli 
Isaurica schuetti

References

Helicidae